The Swift Motor Company made Swift Cars in Coventry, England from 1900 until 1931. It grew progressively from James Starley's Coventry Sewing Machine Company, via bicycle and motorised cycle manufacture. The cars ranged from a single-cylinder car in 1900 using an MMC engine, through a Swift-engined twin-cylinder 7-horsepower light car in 1904, and a 3-litre model in 1913. After the First World War a successful range was sold during the 1920s, but the Cadet of 1930 was its last vehicle as it could not compete economically with volume manufacturers such as Ford and Morris Motors.

History

The Coventry Sewing Machine Company was founded by James Starley in 1859. It started making bicycles in 1869 and changed the name to Coventry Machinists Company. In 1896 it became the Swift Cycle Company and started to make motorcycles in 1898, and experimenting with an early car in 1900. In 1902 a separate company was formed for motor vehicle production and registered as the Swift Motor Company.

After World War 1 ended, the Cycle Car company was merged with the main company as Swift of Coventry and the range was simplified.

In 1919, A Harper Bean & Sons, who also made Bean Cars, bought 50% of Swift's ordinary shares, but got into severe financial difficulties later that year, seriously affecting the company's finances.

The last Swift car was the 1930 Cadet. Swift was too small to compete with the likes of Ford and Morris, and closed in 1931 after its suppliers foreclosed on its debts. Coventry Climax was left with a number of engines from the Cadet model, which it used as the basis of its Second World War fire pump engine designated FSM, the SM standing for Swift Motors.

Production was originally in the Cheylesmore Works but in 1906 car assembly moved to a new factory, Quinton Works in Mile Lane. Some of the cars were equipped with engines manufactured in Saint-Denis Paris by Aster in single, twin or four cylinder configurations.

Cycles and Motorcycles
In 1869, 'Coventry Machinists' started making bicycles and in 1896 it became the 'Swift Cycle Company'. In 1898 it started making motorcycles.

Voiturettes
Swift made its first single-cylinder car in 1900 using an MMC engine. It had an unusual transmission system involving an unsprung two ratio rear axle. The Swift voiturettes, described in the Automotor Journal of 1902, were modified in 1903 to include a reverse gear.

Cyclecars

The Swift cycle car at the 1912 Olympia Motor Cycle and Cycle Car Show was described as a true motor car on a small scale (but for the fact it was constructed of weldless steel tubing). The twin cylinder vertical water-cooled engine was said to resemble just two cylinders of the 13.9 hp Swift standard model, and with a bore of 75 mm and stroke of 110 mm, it had a capacity of 970 cc and rating of 7-horsepower. The gearbox operated by gated change offered three forward speeds and reverse.

The 1914 model was exhibited at the 1913 Olympia show, the company still named Swift Cycle Co Ltd, at which time its price was £140 'fully equipped'. For 1914 the car changed over to steel channel frame carried on four semi-elliptic leaf springs. The car had worm and sector steering, and the brakes comprised a pedal operated transmission brake and two hand-lever operated external contracting brakes. The two-seater body had the seats slightly staggered, and the specification included the hood, adjustable windscreen, a boot, mudguards, running boards, and an acetylene lighting set. The engine remained at 970 cc and was fitted with an Eisemann magneto and Claudel carburettor. The clutch was a leather lined cone type fitted into the external flywheel. The petrol tank was placed behind the dashboard and fed the carburettor by gravity.

After World War 1 the Cycle Car company was merged with the main car company as Swift of Coventry.

Swift Cars

The first Swift car of the conventional type was the twin-cylinder 7-horsepower, later 10-horsepower, of 1904. This was shortly afterwards joined by the four-cylinder 12/14, which continued in a bewildering number of guises until the First World War. These cars were entirely built at the Swift works, with the exception of the engines which were built in Coventry by Messrs White and Poppe.

In 1904, the Swift Cycle Company Ltd. made a single-cylinder 700 cc car (possibly a voiturette) which had a cloverleaf emblem on its radiator, an emblem that was adopted by all the cars. In the years 1909–11 another single-cylinder 7-horsepower car was manufactured, this time with 1100 cc (105 mm bore and 127 mm stroke). This car was also sold by Austin as the first Austin 7.

A larger car, the 15, with a 3-litre engine was added to the range in 1913, and this continued to just post-war. During the First World War, car production ceased.

After the war ended, the Cycle Car company was merged with the main company as Swift of Coventry. A Harper Bean & Sons, who also made Bean Cars, bought 50% of Swift's ordinary shares in 1919, but got into severe financial difficulties later that year, seriously affecting the company's finances.

The Swift range was simplified with the excellent 1100 cc 10 continuing and joined by a 2-litre 12 with a 4-speed gearbox. Standard front wheel brakes were added in 1926 and the engine was bored out to 1190 cc to become the P type. The engine grew again to 1307 cc in 1929 when the car became the P2.

From 1924 Swift supplied Q type engines for the Ariel Ten light car. This model continued until 1925, when Ariel ceased making cars to concentrate on motorcycles.

The last Swift car was the 1930 Cadet, which was an attempt to compete with the £100 cars. This had an 850 cc Coventry Climax engine and a price of £149 for the tourer and £165 for the saloon. But Swift was too small to compete with the likes of Ford and Morris and closed in 1931 after its suppliers foreclosed on its debts. Coventry Climax was left with a number of engines for the Cadet model, which it used as the basis of its Second World War fire pump engine designated FSM, the SM standing for Swift Motors.

Principal Swift cars

Quinton Works

The Quinton Works with frontages on Quinton Road and Mile Lane in Cheylesmore, Coventry, originally built in 1890 for S & B Gorton for cycle manufacture, was acquired in 1905 by the Swift Motor Company, who made a motorcycle and a motor tricycle in 1898, and a conventional car by 1901 in its Cheylesmore Works in Little Park Street, but needed more factory space.
The frontages of the Quinton Works have been preserved and the building is now used as a hotel.

See also
 List of car manufacturers of the United Kingdom

References

External links
The Swift motor vehicles owners club
The Swift Crusader Fabric Saloon

1900 establishments in England
Coventry motor companies
Cyclecars
Defunct motor vehicle manufacturers of England
Vehicle manufacturing companies established in 1900
Vehicle manufacturing companies disestablished in 1931
1931 disestablishments in England